Tripod Island is a small island which lies close south of the west extremity of Eta Island and marks the north side of the western entrance to Andersen Harbor in the Melchior Islands, Palmer Archipelago. The name was probably given by DI personnel who roughly surveyed the island in 1927. The island was resurveyed by Argentine expeditions in 1942, 1943 and 1948.

See also 
 Composite Antarctic Gazetteer
 List of Antarctic and sub-Antarctic islands
 List of Antarctic islands south of 60° S
 SCAR
 Territorial claims in Antarctica

References

External links 

Islands of the Palmer Archipelago